MZY may refer to:

 MZY, IATA code for Mossel Bay Airport, on the List of airports in South Africa
 mzy, ISO code for Mozambican Sign Language
 MZY, Smartshares Australian Mid Cap fund on the List of New Zealand exchange-traded funds